Dušan Lukášik (28 May 1932 – 3 September 2010) was a Slovak basketball player. He competed in the men's tournament at the 1960 Summer Olympics.

See also
Czechoslovak Basketball League career stats leaders

References

1932 births
2010 deaths
Slovak men's basketball players
Olympic basketball players of Czechoslovakia
Basketball players at the 1960 Summer Olympics
Sportspeople from Ružomberok